Gerhard Hastik (born 1 June 1939) is an Austrian weightlifter. He competed in the men's light heavyweight event at the 1964 Summer Olympics.

References

1939 births
Living people
Austrian male weightlifters
Olympic weightlifters of Austria
Weightlifters at the 1964 Summer Olympics
Place of birth missing (living people)
20th-century Austrian people